Breaker is the third studio album by Christian metalcore band For Today, released on August 31, 2010.

Track listing

Personnel 
For Today
 Mattie Montgomery - lead vocals
 Ryan Leitru - lead guitar
 Mike Reynolds - rhythm guitar
 Brandon Leitru - bass guitar
 David Morrison - drums, percussion

Production
Produced, Engineered, Mixed, and mastered by Will Putney
Artwork by Sol Amstutz and layout by Sons of Nero

References 

2010 albums
For Today albums
Facedown Records albums
Albums produced by Will Putney
Albums with cover art by Sons of Nero